Nightbird may refer to:

 Strisores, a group of birds sometimes called "nightbirds"
 "Nightbird" (Stevie Nicks song), 1983
 Nightbird (Paul Carrack album), released in 1980
 Nightbird (Yanni album), released in 1997
 Nightbird (Erasure album), released in 2005
 Nightbird (Eva Cassidy album), released in 2015
 Nightbird (Transformers), a Transformers character
 Alison Steele, a New York disk jockey known as "The Nightbird"

See also
 Nightbirds, a 1974 album by Labelle
 Night Birds (disambiguation)